The 1958 FIFA World Cup qualification for Asia and Africa served as the preliminary tournament for the region. The winner of the tournament went on to face a European team in an Inter-confederation play-off. For an overview of the qualification rounds, see the article 1958 FIFA World Cup qualification.

FIFA rejected the entries of Ethiopia and South Korea, whereas Chinese Taipei withdrew. The remaining 8 teams played in a knockout tournament, with matches on a home-and-away basis. The tournament winner would qualify.

Format
There were four rounds:
 First Round: 8 teams were divided into 4 groups of 2 teams to determine four winners.
 Second Round: The 4 first round winners played in one group with 2 advancing to the final round.
 Final Round:  The remaining two teams contested one spot in the CAF/AFC–UEFA play-off.

CAF / AFC First round

Group 1

Group 2

Group 3

Group 4

CAF / AFC Second round

CAF / AFC Final round

Inter-confederation play-off

Goalscorers

4 goals
 Rusli Ramang
1 goal
 Zhang Honggen
 Nian Weisi
 Sun Fucheng
 Wang Lu
 Siddiq Manzul
 Suleiman Faris
 Endang Witarsa
 Jabra Ala-Zarqa

References

External links
FIFA World Cup Official Site - 1958 World Cup Qualification
RSSSF - 1958 World Cup Qualification

FIFA World Cup qualification (AFC)
FIFA World Cup qualification (CAF)
AFC and CAF